Bay is an administrative region (gobol) in southern Somalia.

Overview
It is bordered by the Somali regions of Bakool, Hiran, Lower Shebelle (Shabeellaha Hoose), Middle Juba (Jubbada Dhexe), and Gedo.

Baidoa used to be the capital of the old Upper Juba region, which today also includes Gedo and Bakool, as well as most parts of the Middle Juba region. Present regions were created in the 1970s by the then ruling military regime. The capital of Bay is Baidoa.

Despite the name Bay, it is landlocked and nowhere near the Indian Ocean shores.

Demographics

The region is mainly inhabited by the Rahanweyn people. According to the Population Estimation Survey (2014) (282), the division of population in the Bay region is as follows: 93,046 urban inhabitants, 463,330 rural settlers, 195,986 nomadic and 39,820 IDPs, making a total of 792,182.

Districts
Bay Region consists of five districts:

 Baidoa District
 Burhakaba District
 Dinsoor District
 Qasadhere District
Berdale District
 Ufurow District

Major towns
Baidoa
Dinsoor
Burhakaba
Berdaale
Qansahdhere
Ufurow
Awdiinle
Eesow

Notes
Eesow

External links
Administrative map of Bay Region

 
Regions of Somalia